Demba Bamba (born 17 March 1998) is a French rugby union player. His position is prop and he currently plays for Lyon in the Top 14.

Early life and education
Demba's parents originate from Mauritania and he grew up in the Saint-Denis area of Paris. He played various sports, including handball, when young.

Playing career
Demba played for the 2019 France U-20 side that won the U-20 World Cup. 

He was selected for the French squad for the 2 February 2020 game against England in the 2020 Six Nations. 

He came on as a substitute in the 2020 Six Nations game against Wales on 22 February 2020.

Honours

Lyon
EPCR Challenge Cup: 2021–22

France
Six Nations Championship: 2022

France U20
Six Nations Under 20s Championship: 2018
World Rugby Under 20 Championship: 2018

References

External links
France profile at FFR
Lyon OU profile

1998 births
Living people
French rugby union players
France international rugby union players
French sportspeople of Mauritanian descent
CA Brive players
Lyon OU players
Sportspeople from Saint-Denis, Seine-Saint-Denis
Rugby union props